Thomas J. Campbell may refer to:
 Thomas J. Campbell (American football) (1886–1972), American football player and coach
 Thomas Jefferson Campbell (1793–1850), U.S. congressman from Tennessee
 Thomas Joseph Campbell (1871–1946), Irish politician, newspaper editor and judge
 Thomas J. Campbell (university president) (1848–1925), president of St. John's College (now Fordham University) in New York
 Tom Campbell (California politician) (born 1952), American economist and California state official
 Tom Campbell (Canadian politician) (1927–2012), mayor of Vancouver, British Columbia

See also
Thomas Campbell (disambiguation)